Kamensky District is an administrative and municipal district (raion), one of the fifty-nine in Altai Krai, Russia. It is located in the north of the krai and borders Krutikhinsky and Suzunsky Districts of Novosibirsk Oblast in the north, Shelabolikhinsky District in the east, Bayevsky and Tyumentsevsky Districts in the south, and Pankrushikhinsky District in the west. Its administrative center is town of Kamen-na-Obi. As of the 2010 Census, the total population of the district was 12,025.

Geography
The district is located on the northern border of Altai Krai, straddling the Ob River, which runs through the district from east to west as it makes its turn to the north.  The terrain is  hilly steppe on the Priobsky Plateau. Besides the Ob, the district is also watered by the Kulundinsky Canal, which has its head pumping station in Kamen-no-Obi.  While much of the area is agricultural land, there are forests in the east on the meandering Ob floodplain, as well as numerous fresh and saltwater lakes. The soils are medium chernozem (black),sandy soils.  The regional city of Barnaul is 125 km to the east.

Climate
The climate is Humid continental climate, cool summer, (Dfb). This climate is characterized by large swings in temperature, both diurnally and seasonally, with mild summers and cold, snowy winters.

Economy
Employment in the district is focused on food processing and agriculture.

References

Notes

Sources



Districts of Altai Krai